Kim Joo-hun (born March 1, 1980) is a South Korean theater, television and film actor. He debuted in 2009 in the Korean adaptation of the stage play Marat Sade and was a member of Alleyway Theater Company until 2014. He is best known for his roles in the television series Encounter (2018), Dr. Romantic 2 (2020), It's Okay to Not Be Okay (2020), Now, We Are Breaking Up (2021), and Big Mouth (2022).

Career

Early career as member of Alleyway Theater Company 
Kim was born in South Korea on March 1, 1980. He majored in sculpture at an Hongik University College of Fine Arts. After being discharged from the military, he wanted to become an actor and entered the acting department. Kim studied at the Seoul Institute of the Arts where he received bachelor degree from the Department of Theater and Film. 

He used to be more interested in the film class and just doing only few theater works. His debut as an actor was in an independent short black and white film A Matter of Principle in 2008. Kim and actor Shim Jae-hyun were working in a school play, they were approached by Professor Park Geun-hyung, one of university professor of the Seoul Institute of the Arts and also leader of Alleyway Theater Company, who invited them to see his play. Kim drawn into theater world, then later debuted in the Seoul Theater Company's Korean production of the play Marat, Sade (2009) by playwright Peter Weiss under direction of Park Geun-hyung himself. Kim also became member of Alleyway Theater Company.

In 2013, in 10th Anniversary Festival of Alleyway Theater Company, Kim acted as poet Lee Sang in Korean two-hander play Raising the Sun in the Sky by playwright Kwon Tae under direction of Lee Eun-joon. This work imprinted Kim Joo-hun's name in theater world, as winner of Best Actor in the 11th Drama Festival Acting Award. In the same year he acted in minor role in feature film Way Back Home (2013).

Hiatus from Theater and Comeback 
Kim left Alleyway Theater Company in 2014 and took hiatus as theater actor for around three years. He did manual labor as construction worker to earn living. Within those years, Kim still accepted minor roles in various films. He subsequently appeared in The Con Artists (2014), Tazza: The Hidden Card (2015), Planck Constant (2015), The Accidental Detective (2015), A Violent Prosecutor (2016), and a box office film Train to Busan (2016). He also debuted in television with minor roles in OCN drama series Squad 38. In 2015 Kim sign exclusive contract with Urban Ent.

In spring 2017, Kim returned to Daehak-ro as Håkon Håkonsson, King-elect of Norway in a premiere of Korean adaptation of Henrik Ibsen's play The Pretenders, titled The Claimants of the Throne. Director Kim Gwang-bo and writer Ko Yeon-ok, teamed up again for this project that performed at Sejong Center for the Performing Arts M Theater. 

In autumn 2017, Kim starred as French Diplomat, Rene Gallimard in a third korean adaptation of David Henry Hwang’s play M. Butterfly, one of repertoire of The 9th Best Plays Festival, Directed by Kim Dong-yeon, it was performed from September to December at the Art One Theater Hall 1.

Breakthrough in small screen and recent theater projects 
Kim also became a scene stealer in tvN drama Argon (2017) as Ahn Jae-geun, a whistleblower at Seomyoung Foods. Kim became known to general television audiences in end of 2018 after starring as Lee Dae-chan in tvN drama series Encounter (2018) alongside Park Bo-gum and Song He-kyo. Before starting this drama, in October 2018, he signed an exclusive contract with his current agency, S.A.L.T Entertainment.

In 2019, Kim costarred in Korean adaptation of US series Designated Survivor: 60 Days. His role is the show's counterpart of Jason Atwood, Jung Han-mo, NIS Terrorism Task Force Chief. 

In 2020, Kim joined Season 2 of SBS drama series in Romantic Doctor Kim Sa Bu, as Park Min-kook, a professor of general surgery and the new director of Doldam Hospital who think of Kim Sa Bu, starred Han Suk-kyu, as his rival. His solid performance won Best Supporting Actor in 2020 SBS Drama Awards.

In the same year, He also begin to be recognized internationally for his role in tvN & Netflix drama series It's Okay to Not Be Okay. He starred as Lee Sang-in, the CEO of SangsangESang Publishing Company, which publishes Moon-young's children's books. He also starred as lead role in short film Untact alongside Kim Go-eun. Kim made special appearance in the pilot episode of tvN television series Start-Up, as the father of Bae Suzy's character.

Kim starred as second lead in KBS drama Do Do Sol Sol La La Sol. Followed by another second lead in SBS drama Now, We Are Breaking Up. His performance earned him Excellence Award for an Actor in a Mini-Series Romance/Comedy Drama in SBS Drama Awards.

In 2022, Kim made another strong impression on viewers as the biggest villain in the MBC Friday-Saturday drama Big Mouse (written by Kim Ha-ram and by directed by Oh Chung-hwan and Bae Hyun-jin), which ended on September 17th. It started with a viewership rate of 6.2% and ended with its own highest viewership rate of 13.7% in the last episode. He acted as Gucheon Mayor Choi Do-ha. Kim will acted as senior astronaut in his next drama Ask the Stars.

In the same year Kim acted in his first lead role in feature film opposite Ryu Hyun-kyung in film Fairy. It was premiered in the 26th Busan International Film Festival.

Endorsements
Kim appeared in a number of advertisements such as IT, outdoor sports, and ice cream brands in the second half of 2018. In the first half of 2019, he appeared in various advertisements such as finance, games, and telecommunication companies, and  became a blue chip in the advertising industry. Kim often appeared in advertising videos directed by Dolphin Kidnapper's Shin Woo-seok, nick-named Bong Joon-ho of the advertising industry. Dolphin Kidnapper is a video production company famous for its novel and B-class sensibility advertisements, resulting in million views.

Filmography

Film

Television series

Web series

Hosting

Music video appearances

Stage

Ambassadorship 
 Unobstructed Film Ambassadors (2023)

Awards and nominations

Notes

References

External links
Kim Joo-hun at Salt Entertainment 

1980 births
Living people
People from Pohang
South Korean male television actors
South Korean male film actors
South Korean male stage actors
21st-century South Korean male actors
Seoul Institute of the Arts alumni